Philautus pallidipes is a species of frog in the family Rhacophoridae.
It is endemic to West Java, Indonesia.

Its natural habitat is subtropical or tropical moist montane forests.
It is threatened by habitat loss.

References

Amphibians of Indonesia
pallidipes
Amphibians described in 1908
Taxonomy articles created by Polbot